Trajan Gate (‘Trayanovi Vrata’ \tra-'ya-no-vi vra-'ta\) is the flat saddle of elevation ca. 850 m extending 4.3 km on Trinity Peninsula, Antarctic Peninsula, which is situated between Malorad Glacier to the north and a Russell West Glacier to the south.  Linking Mount Ignatiev and Srednogorie Heights to the west, and Louis-Philippe Plateau to the east.

The hill is named after the Gate of Trajan, a mountain pass in western Bulgaria.

Location
German-British mapping in 1996.

Maps
 Trinity Peninsula. Scale 1:250000 topographic map No. 5697. Institut für Angewandte Geodäsie and British Antarctic Survey, 1996.
 Antarctic Digital Database (ADD). Scale 1:250000 topographic map of Antarctica. Scientific Committee on Antarctic Research (SCAR), 1993–2016.

References
 Bulgarian Antarctic Gazetteer. Antarctic Place-names Commission. (details in Bulgarian, basic data in English)
 SCAR Composite Antarctic Gazetteer

External links
 Trajan Gate. Copernix satellite image

Mountain passes of Trinity Peninsula
Bulgaria and the Antarctic